Once Upon a Horse... is a 1958 American Western comedy film written and directed by Hal Kanter. The film stars Dan Rowan, Dick Martin, Martha Hyer, Leif Erickson, Nita Talbot, James Gleason, and John McGiver with Olympic Gold medalist weightlifter Paul Anderson as the blacksmith. The film was released in September 1958, by Universal Pictures.

Plot

Cast        
Dan Rowan as Dan Casey
Dick Martin as Doc Logan
Martha Hyer as Miss Amity Babb
Leif Erickson as Granville Dix
Nita Talbot as Miss Dovey Barnes
James Gleason as Postmaster
John McGiver as Mr. Tharp
David Burns as Bruno de Gruen
Dick Ryan as Henry Dick Coryell
Max Baer as Ben
Buddy Baer as Beulah's Brother
Steve Pendleton as Milligan
Sydney Chatton as Engineer
Sam Hearn as Justice of the Peace
Ingrid Goude as Beulah
Ricky Kelman as Small Boy 
Joe Oakie as Fireman
Tom Keene as himself
Robert Livingston as himself
Kermit Maynard as himself
Bob Steele as himself
Paul Anderson as Blacksmith
Tom London as Old-Timer (uncredited)

Reception
Leonard Maltin gave the film two and a half stars.

References

External links
 

1958 films
American Western (genre) comedy films
1950s Western (genre) comedy films
Universal Pictures films
CinemaScope films
Films directed by Hal Kanter
1958 comedy films
1950s English-language films
1950s American films